A reaction video is a video in which people react to something. Videos showing the emotional reactions of people viewing television series episodes, film trailers and music videos are also numerous and popular on video hosting services such as YouTube. The depicted persons may or may not be aware that they are being recorded. In some cases, the video to which people react is shown within the reaction video, allowing the reaction video's viewers to see what is being reacted to.

History
On television, reaction clips have for a long time been a feature of Japanese variety shows, showing celebrities and tarento reacting to video clips. An evolution of earlier 1970s Japanese TV quiz shows that featured audience participants responding to questions, Fuji Television's Naruhodo! The World in 1981 introduced a format where a panel of celebrities and comedians watched brief videos and answered questions on the video. This eventually evolved into the "waipu" format, where a "waipu box" superimposed on the corner of the screen shows a celebrity or tarento reacting to a video clip. This reaction format is still widely used in Japanese variety shows, where it is the equivalent of a laugh track on American television shows.

Online, one of the first viral reaction videos was that of a child reacting to the "Scary Maze Game" prank on YouTube in 2006. Beginning in 2007, reaction videos began to proliferate on the Internet. Among their first topics were reactions to the scat fetish pornography trailer 2 Girls 1 Cup. By 2011, videos of people recording themselves reacting to film trailers had become a staple of services such as YouTube. The numerous reaction videos for particularly popular or shocking television events, such as the 2013 Game of Thrones episode "The Rains of Castamere", have themselves become the subject of commentary.

In 2013, the British TV channel Channel 4 converted the reaction video format into a TV show through Gogglebox. In this reality show, families or groups of friends watching and discuss popular television broadcasts of the previous week in their own homes. The format was successful and spawned licensed adaptations in other television markets.

Music reaction videos
Music reaction videos involve people filming themselves and their reactions to a song, or a music video for a song, as they listen to it for the first time. Some videos offer a contrast with the listener being outside of the traditional audience for the music. The New York Times noted that many videos involved younger, Black listeners responding positively to music by older, white musicians.

Some YouTube channels doing music reaction videos have become very successful, with major music labels reaching out to channels to promote their artists. When Tim and Fred Williams' reaction video to Phil Collins' "In the Air Tonight" went viral, it pushed the song to #2 on the iTunes chart.

Reception
Sam Anderson, commenting on the phenomenon for The New York Times Magazine, described it as encapsulating the "fundamental experience of the Internet" in that it involved watching screens on which people watched screens, in a potentially infinite regression. The first reaction videos for the gross-out 2 Girls 1 Cup allowed people, according to Anderson, to "experience its dangerous thrill without having to encounter it directly—like Perseus looking at Medusa in the reflection of his shield". But much like the later videos featuring reactions to items of popular culture, Anderson wrote, such videos provide the appeal of experiencing, "at a time of increasing cultural difference, the comforting universality of human nature" in showing people of all backgrounds reacting similarly to a shared cultural experience.

In CraveOnline, Witney Seibold derided reaction videos as "graceless" and "narcissistic", because they merely reflected immediate emotional reactions, and doubted that the reactions of a person aware of being filmed could in fact reflect the honest emotional response promised by the format.

In an article in Complex, USC Professor Lisa Aziz-Zadeh suggests a role for mirror neurons that allow us to share the experience of the person we are watching in a video.

See also
 React (media franchise)

References

Video hosting
Internet culture